Jon Odriozola Mugarza (born 26 December 1970) is a Spanish former cyclist who rode professionally between 1995 and 2004 for the ,  and  teams. Odriozola most recently worked as the general manager for UCI Professional Continental team .

Career achievements

Major results
1997
3rd Subida a Urkiola
3rd GP Llodio
2001
1st Subida a Urkiola

Grand Tour general classification results timeline

References

External links

1970 births
Living people
Spanish male cyclists
Cyclists from the Basque Country (autonomous community)
People from Oñati
Sportspeople from Gipuzkoa